Lej Nair (literally "black lake" in Romansh) is a small lake on Bernina Pass in the canton of Grisons, Switzerland. It is located near the summit of the pass, between Lago Bianco ("white lake") and Lej Pitschen ("small lake"). While Lago Bianco drains to the Adriatic Sea, Lej Nair and Lej Pitschen are part of the basin of the Inn River draining into the Black Sea.

See also
List of mountain lakes of Switzerland

External links 

Lakes of Switzerland
Lakes of Graubünden
St. Moritz